Looking at Me may refer to:

"Looking at Me (J'aime regarder)", a 2009 song by Laurent Wéry & Sir-G
"Lookin' at Me", a 1998 song by Mase
 "Looking at Me", a song by Sabrina Carpenter from the 2019 album Singular: Act II